Sedum rubrotinctum or Sedum × rubrotinctum, and commonly known as jelly-beans, jelly bean plant, or pork and beans. It is a species of Sedum from the plant family Crassulaceae. It is a succulent plant originating in Mexico.

Name

 
The plant is nicknamed for its short leaves that resemble jelly beans, especially when taking on a protective hue. It was named officially as a distinct species in 1948.

Description
The leaves of Sedum rubrotinctum change colour from green to red during the summer months as a protective adaptation. The plant sprouts bright yellow flowers from between the leaves in mid-spring.

Taxonomy
It has also been classified as a hybrid plant — of   ×  — named Sedum × rubrotinctum.

Cultivation
Sedum rubrotinctum is cultivated as an ornamental plant, for planting in gardens and as potted plants. It is grown very easily and tolerates all types of soil except for those that are poorly drained. It grows very well in summer, can take variations in climate, although it is not frost-tolerant.

New plants may be grown from leaves (or beans) that drop off or are separated from the stem and laid on soil.

This plant has won the Royal Horticultural Society's Award of Garden Merit.

Sedum rubrotinctum is poisonous and may cause irritation when ingested or touched.

References

External links
IPNI Listing
Kew Plant List

rubrotinctum
Endemic flora of Mexico
Garden plants of North America
Drought-tolerant plants
Groundcovers